Kirkland Elementary School District #23 is a school district based in Kirkland, Arizona, consisting of a single K-8 school.

In addition to Kirkland the district includes Wilhoit.

The school was established circa 1909.  the school district has little of a taxation base, so much of the taxes comes from residents. The residents lacked the tax money to rebuild the school, though the current building had modern technology.

 the Prescott Unified School District takes secondary students from the district, as it is required to under law. The Prescott district operates Prescott High School.

Until its 2021 disestablishment, Walnut Grove Elementary School District, which did not operate any schools at the end of its life, sent students seeking traditional schooling to Kirkland Elementary. The Kirkland district absorbed the parts of the Walnut Grove district to the north.

References

Further reading
 Kirkland Elementary School District
 Division of School Audits Performance Audit February Kirkland Elementary School District Report No. 16-201 – 2016

School districts in Yavapai County, Arizona
Public K–8 schools in Arizona